Muhammad Azam may refer to:
 Muhammed Azam Didamari, Sufi Kashmiri writer
 Muhammad Azam (weightlifter), Pakistani weightlifter
 Muhammad Azam Shah, Mughal emperor in 1707